Javier Cárdenas may refer to:
 Javier Cárdenas (footballer) (1952–2022), Mexican footballer
Javier Cárdenas (presenter) (born 1970), Spanish singer and television and radio presenter
Javier Cárdenas (journalist) (born 1988), Venezuelan journalist and activist
Javier Valdez Cárdenas (1967–2017), Mexican journalist and founder of Ríodoce, a newspaper based in Sinaloa